Win Labuda (born Winfried Gerhard Labudda: 26 June 1938, in Danzig) is a German researcher, science photographer and entrepreneur.

Research
Labuda  founded the company Clear & Clean GmbH in Lübeck in 1979. From then on his research activities focused on surface cleanliness in relation to the mechanics of wiper-based cleaning procedures. For this purpose, he developed a number of test methods and devices. Labuda is the author and co-author of a number of patents and extensive technical literature, published by the publishing house of the VDI (Association of German Engineers) and by the GIT publishing house, in addition to numerous online publications.

Art
Labuda has produced extensive photographic work since the 1950s and has mounted exhibitions since 1981 in Munich, Paris, Tokyo, Düsseldorf and New York. In 2012 the photobook A Journey to the Beginning of Time was published. It is a photographic cycle in four series that reflects on the history of earth and mankind from an artist's perspective.

From 1982 on, Labuda has also produced drawings, graphic art, reliefs and sculptures.  Along with Nadja Labuda, he is the author of a number of online publications on photography, painting and graphic art.

References

Literature (excerpt) 

 
 
 
 
 
Lodevicus Hermans, Win Labuda: "Triboelectric Charges in the Semiconductor Production Environment". [Elektrische Oberflächen-Ladungen im Fertigungs-Umfeld der Halbleiter-Industrie]. ReinraumTechnik 1,2,3/2005, GIT Verlag
Win Labuda: "Cleanroom Consumables - Aspects, Simulation, Arguments". Reinraum-Verbrauchsmaterial - Aspekte, Simulation, Argumente. ReinraumTechnik 1/2017, Special Edition, Wiley-VCH Verlag, Weinhein
Win Labuda: "On the History of Clean Working". [Zur Geschichte des Reinen Arbeitens]. ReinraumTechnik 3/2018, Wiley-VCH Verlag, Weinheim
about Labuda: "Portrait of a Visionary - A Brief Biography of Win Labuda" Portrait eines Visionärs - das Leben des Win Labuda.  Biography and laudations, ReinraumTechnik 4/2018, Wiley-VCH Verlag, Weinheim

External links
 http://labuda.de/

Photographers from Schleswig-Holstein
Engineers from Schleswig-Holstein
1938 births
Living people
People from Lübeck